Moïse Orell Dion Sahi (born 20 December 2001), or simply Moïse Sahi, is a professional footballer who plays as a forward for  club Annecy, on loan from  club Strasbourg. Born in Ivory Coast, he holds both Ivorian and Malian citizenship.

Career 
A youth product of Afrique Football Élite, Sahi signed for Strasbourg's reserve side in January 2021. However, he made his professional debut for the first team on 4 April 2021, coming on as a substitute in a 3–2 Ligue 1 win over Bordeaux. Six days later, he scored his first goal for the club in a 4–1 loss to Paris Saint-Germain.

On 3 August 2022, Sahi joined Ligue 2 side Annecy on loan for the season. He made his club debut in a 1–0 loss to Amiens on 6 August, and scored his first two goals for the club in 2–2 draw against Rodez two weeks later. On 1 March 2023, Sahi scored Annecy's first goal in a 2–2 draw against Marseille in the Coupe de France quarter-finals; Annecy would go on to win 6–5 on penalties, qualifying for the semi-finals for the first time ever.

Personal life 
Born in Ivory Coast, Sahi is of Malian descent.

Career statistics

References

External links 
 

2001 births
Living people
Footballers from Abidjan
Malian footballers
Ivorian footballers
Ivorian people of Malian descent
RC Strasbourg Alsace players
FC Annecy players
Ligue 1 players
Ligue 2 players
Association football forwards
Malian expatriate footballers
Ivorian expatriate footballers
Expatriate footballers in France
Malian expatriate sportspeople in France
Ivorian expatriate sportspeople in France